U.S. Route 59 (US 59) is a north–south United States highway (though it was signed east–west in parts of Texas). A latecomer to the U.S. numbered route system, US 59 is now a border-to-border route, part of the NAFTA Corridor Highway System. Its number is out of place since US 59 is either concurrent with or entirely west of U.S. Route 71. Its southern terminus is at the Mexico–US border in Laredo, Texas, where it continues as Mexican Federal Highway 85D.

Route description

Texas

U.S. Highway 59 (US 59) in the U.S. state of Texas is named the Lloyd Bentsen Highway, after Lloyd Bentsen, former U.S. Senator from Texas. In northern Houston, US 59, co-signed with Interstate 69 (I-69), is the Eastex Freeway (from downtown Houston to the Liberty County/Montgomery County line). To the south, which is also co-signed with I-69, it is the Southwest Freeway (from Rosenberg to downtown Houston), which is one of the busiest sections of freeway in the United States with a vehicle count, as of 2006, over 330,000 vehicles per day just outside the Loop.

US 59 (overlapped by US 71) actually straddles the border between Texas and Arkansas north of I-30 near Texarkana, with the east side of the highway on the Arkansas side and the west side of the highway on the Texas side. In the past, both highways remained on the border past I-30 as State Line Avenue to downtown Texarkana; today, only US 71 does so. Nearly 90% of this route is designated to become part of I-69 in the future. Currently,  speed limits are allowed on US 59 in Duval County and portions of northern Polk County.

From the southwestern suburbs of Houston to downtown Houston, U.S. 59 is commonly referred to as the "Southwest Freeway", sometimes derisively as the "Southwest's Best Freeway." Supporting 371,000 vehicles per day, it is one of the busiest freeways in the United States. U.S. 59 is known as the "Eastex Freeway" in the north/northeast part of the Houston region. At the Mexico–US border, it ends at the World Trade International Bridge in Laredo, Texas. In Laredo, U.S. 59 is co-signed with both Interstate 69W (I-69W) and Loop 20, and has an intersection with Interstate 35 which ends at the Juarez-Lincoln International Bridge. After crossing the bridge into Mexico, Interstate 35 continues as Mexican Federal Highway 85 in Nuevo Laredo, which then runs through Mexico and Central America and ends in Panama at the Panama Canal.

Arkansas
In Arkansas, US 59 is concurrent with U.S. Route 71 from Interstate 30 at Texarkana to Acorn, and with U.S. Route 270 from Acorn to the Oklahoma state line. The Third Loop was to be extended on Interstate 49 from its original northern end to US-71 at the Texas state line opened on May 15, 2013, and was extended to State Line Road, where it intersects US-59 and US-71 in Texas.

Oklahoma

US 59 is co-signed with U.S. Route 270 from the Arkansas state line to Heavener and U.S. Route 271 from Poteau to west of Spiro. It is also co-signed with U.S. Route 64 in Sallisaw.

Kansas

U.S. 59 enters the state just south of Chetopa and runs nearly directly north across the state. The intersection immediately south of Garnett used to be a "braided" intersection with stop and yield signs. It was identified as a high-crash location in 2001, and was rebuilt as a roundabout that opened in April 2006. The Kansas Department of Transportation is rebuilding or planning to rebuild several other rural intersections as roundabouts for increased safety. Until 2012, US 59 passed through Ottawa, Kansas, and had to be shut down or detoured every time the Marias Des Cygnes floodwall gates were closed across the highway. The highway now bypasses around Ottawa, running concurrently with Interstate 35 for 5 mi and using that highway's bridges over the Marias Des Cygnes. US 59 passes through Lawrence. The street name of US 59 in Lawrence is Iowa Street, then 6th Street as it joins U.S. 40 and jogs east to cross the Kansas River near downtown. North of the U.S. 40 and 59 Bridges, it splits with U.S. 40 as it joins U.S. 24 briefly and jogs back west before resuming a northerly course. It continues north to Nortonville, then northeast to Atchison, where it crosses the Missouri River over the Amelia Earhart Bridge.

U.S. 59 has been rebuilt and rerouted just to the east between Lawrence and Ottawa as a divided highway, as the former road was one of the most dangerous stretches of highway in the state. The project began in mid-2007, and was completed and opened to the public on October 17, 2012.

Missouri
In Missouri, US 59 roughly follows the Missouri River in the northwest corner of the state, from its entrance at Winthrop. In Saint Joseph, the highway is paired with Interstate 229 through downtown. US 59 departs from I-229 as Saint Joseph Avenue, joining with U.S. Route 71 at Interstate 29. The two highways then separate in Savannah. US 59 then follows Interstate 29 very closely until turning northward at Craig. This section of US 59 is immortalized in the Brewer and Shipley song "Tarkio Road".

Iowa

In Iowa, US 59 is a main north–south artery in the western part of the state.  It enters Iowa south of Shenandoah and joins Interstate 80 at Avoca.  It passes through the county seats of Harlan, Denison, Cherokee, and Primghar.  Except for small stretches of expressway near Avoca, Denison, and Holstein, the entire length of US 59 in Iowa is an undivided two-lane road.  US 59 exits the state near Hawkeye Point, the highest point in the state of Iowa.

Minnesota
It passes through rural western Minnesota for its entire length in the state. Some cities along the way include Slayton, Marshall, Clarkfield, Montevideo, and Morris. US 59 overlaps Interstate 94/U.S. Highway 52 in the Fergus Falls area. North of Fergus Falls, US 59 passes through Pelican Rapids, Detroit Lakes, and Thief River Falls before ending at the Lancaster–Tolstoi border crossing on the Canada–US border. US-59 runs for about  through Minnesota.

The Minnesota section of US 59 is legally defined as all or part of Routes 265, 16, 17, 88, 66, 144, 3, 30, and 174 in Minnesota Statutes §§ 161.115(19), (75), and (196) and 161.114(2).

History

In 1934, a coalition of government officials from Missouri, Iowa, and Minnesota agreed to sign the current US 59 as Highway 73 in an attempt to extend US 73 north from Atchison, Kansas. However, AASHO approved the route as US 59, instead.

The part in Missouri was defined in 1922 as Route 52 from Kansas to St. Joseph, Route 1 from St. Joseph to Tarkio, and Route 61 from Tarkio to Iowa. Route 61 became Route 9 in 1926, and Route 52 became part of Route 4 in 1927, and this portion became Route 18 in 1932, before being removed in favor of US 59 in the 1930s.

Historic termini
Before the 1950s, US 59 headed northwest to US 75 at Noyes, crossed the Red River of the North at St. Vincent, and terminated at US 81 in Pembina, North Dakota. A new highway and border crossing were built north of Lancaster on the present alignment in 1950. The former segment of US 59 between Lancaster and US 75 became CR 6, and the extremely short segment between US 75 and US 81 became MN 171 and ND 59. ND 59 still exists in Pembina from the state line to I-29.

From 1934 to 1935, the US 59 designation referred to a -long route across southeastern Minnesota, from Lake City, Minnesota, to the Iowa state line just short of Chester, Iowa. That entire route is now part of US 63, and nowhere close to the present US 59, established in 1935.

In 1933, much of the present US 59 and the entirety of US 96 in Texas were originally proposed to be part of US 71.  Under this plan, discussed at a meeting of the United States Good Roads Association in Beaumont, US 71 was to be diverted out of Louisiana altogether and instead rerouted from the Texarkana area southward through East Texas.

Future
A large portion of US 59 is proposed to become part of the future extension of I-69, I-69W and I-369 through Texas, allowing the current alignment and right-of-way to be upgraded without the need for government environmental studies or extensive eminent domain proceedings.

Major intersections
Texas
 World Trade International Bridge at the Mexico–US border
  in Laredo. The highways travel concurrently through the city.
  in Laredo
  in George West
  east of George West
  in Beeville
  in Goliad
  southwest of Victoria. I-69/US 59 will travel concurrently to Houston. US 59/US 77 travels concurrently to south-southwest of Victoria.
  in Victoria
  in Houston
  in Houston
  in Houston
  in Houston. I-69/US 59 will travel concurrently to Tenaha.
  in Livingston
  in Corrigan
  in Lufkin. The highways travel concurrently through the city.
  in Redfield
  in Timpson. The highways travel concurrently to Tenaha.
  in Tenaha. I-369/US 59 will travel concurrently to Texarkana.
  in Carthage. The highways travel concurrently to north of Carthage.
  in Marshall
  in Marshall
  in Texarkana. I-369/US 59 travels concurrently to I-30.
  in Texarkana
  in Texarkana
  in Texarkana. I-30/US 59 travels concurrently to the Arkansas state line.
Arkansas
  in Texarkana. US 59/US 71 travels concurrently to Acorn.
Texas
  north of Texarkana
Arkansas
  in Lockesburg. The highways travel concurrently to De Queen.
  in Saline Township. The highways travel concurrently to De Queen.
  in Wickes
  in Acorn. US 59/US 270 travels concurrently to Heavener, Oklahoma.
Oklahoma
  west-northwest of Page
  in Poteau. The highways travel concurrently to west of Spiro.
  in Sallisaw
  in Sallisaw. The highways travel concurrently through the city.
  in Westville
  in West Siloam Springs. The highways travel concurrently to Kansas.
  east-northeast of Afton. US 59/US 69 travels concurrently to north of Dotyville.
  east-northeast of Afton
Kansas
  in Chetopa. The highways travel concurrently through the city.
  in Oswego. The highways travel concurrently to the Mount Pleasant–Fairview township line.
  in Parsons
  in Moran
  in Welda Township. The highways travel concurrently to Washington Township.
  in Ottawa. The highways travel concurrently to Ottawa Township.
  in Willow Springs Township
  in Lawrence. The highways travel concurrently through the city.
  in Lawrence
  in Lawrence. US 24/US 59 travels concurrently to Williamstown.
  in Shannon Township. The highways travel concurrently to Atchison.
Missouri
  in St. Joseph. The highways travel concurrently through the city.
  in St. Joseph
  in Jefferson Township
  in Nodaway Township
  in Jackson Township. The highways travel concurrently to Nodaway Township.
  in Hickory Township
  in Hickory Township
  in Union Township
  in Tarkio Township. The highways travel concurrently to Tarkio.
Iowa
  in Indian Creek Township
  in Belknap Township. The highways travel concurrently to Oakland.
  in Avoca
  in Denison. The highways travel concurrently through the city.
  on the Logan–Griggs township line. The highways travel concurrently to Holstein.
  on the Franklin–Lincoln township line. The highways travel concurrently to Sanborn.
Minnesota
  in Worthington
  in Custer Township
  in Camp Release Township. The highways travel concurrently to Montevideo.
  in Moyer Township
  on the Buse–Dane Prairie township line. The highways travel concurrently to Fergus Falls Township.
  in Detroit Lakes
  in Knute Township
  at the Canada–US border on the Richardville–St. Joseph township line

See also

 U.S. Route 159
 U.S. Route 259

References

External links

Endpoints of US 59

 
059
United States Numbered Highway System
U.S. Highways in Arkansas
U.S. Highways in Minnesota
U.S. Highways in Missouri
U.S. Highways in North Dakota